Tashigang, also spelt Trashigang and Zhaxigang, is a place name in the Tibetan language meaning "good fortune ridge". It may refer to:

 Tashigang, Ngari Prefecture in western Tibet
 Tashi Nang Township, a township in Dinggyê County, Tibet Autonomous Region
 Tashigang, Sa'gya, a township in Sa'gya County, Tibet Autonomous Region
 Tashigang, Lhatse, a township in Lhatse County, Tibet Autonomous Region
 Tashigang, Himachal Pradesh in India
 Trashigang District in Bhutan
 Trashigang, a town in the Trashigang District of Bhutan
 Trashigang Dzong, a fortified monastery in the Trashigang District of Bhutan

See also
 Tashi (disambiguation)